Toru Abo (1947 - December 6, 2016) was a Japanese immunologist and author from the Aomori Prefecture. His work involved creating monoclonal antibodies against natural killer cells.

Education and career 
He received his PhD from Tohoku University School of Medicine. He served as a professor of medicine at Niigata University. Abo was also a member of the Department of Medicine and Surgery at the University of Alabama at Birmingham.

Selected publications 
 The Only Two Causes of All Diseases
 Your Immune Revolution and Healing Your Healing Power

References 

Japanese immunologists
Tohoku University alumni
People from Aomori Prefecture
1947 births
2016 deaths